Rene Lehtinen (born 27 March 1985) is a Finnish motorcycle speedway rider who was a member of Finland team at 2007 Speedway World Cup.

Career details

World Championships 
 Team World Championship (Speedway World Team Cup and Speedway World Cup)
 2007 - 8th place (did not start as reserve)
 Team U-21 World Championship
 2005 - 4th place in Qualifying Round 3
 2006 - 4th place in Qualifying Round 2

See also 
 Finland national speedway team

World Longtrack Championship

Grand-Prix Years
 2009 - 1 app (21st) 7pts
 2011 - 1 app (21st) 2pt
 2012 - 1 app (25th) 5pts

Team Championship
 2007  Morizes (6th) 11/18pts (Rode with Mikko Rahko, Markus Helin)
 2008  Wertle (4th) 15/30pts (Rode with Kaj Laukanen, Aki-Pekka Mustonen, Jan-Eric Korkemaki)
 2009  Eenrum (6th) 1/31pts (Rode with Joonas Kylmakorpi, Kaj Laukanen, Aki Pekka Mustonen)
 2010  Morizes (5th) 0/24pts (Rode with Joonas Kylmakorpi, Pasi Pulliainen, Aki Pekka Mustonen)
 2011  Scheeßel (6th) 10/26pts (Rode with Simo Pulli, Aki Pekka Mustonen)

European Grasstrack Championship

Finals
 2008  Siddeburen (Third) 16pts

Semi-finals
 2006  Gorredijk (N/S)
 2007  Hertingan (11th) 9pts
 2009  Stadskanaal (8th) 10pts
 2011  Staphorst (7th) 10pts
 2013  Noordwolde (11th) 8pts

References 
 http://grasstrackgb.co.uk/rene-lehtinen/

1985 births
Finnish speedway riders
Living people